For the 1957–58 season, Carlisle United F.C. competed in Football League Third Division North.

Results & fixtures

Football League Third Division North

FA Cup

References
 11v11

Carlisle United F.C. seasons